WIPS may refer to:

 WIPS (AM), a radio station (1250 AM) formerly licensed to Ticonderoga, New York, United States
 Wireless intrusion prevention system, a network device that monitors the radio spectrum for the presence of unauthorized access points
 Walk-in Payment Services, a payment system for people without other access to online services.